Fourth-seeded Gottfried von Cramm defeated Jack Crawford 6–4, 7–9, 3–6, 7–5, 6–3 in the final to win the men's singles tennis title at the 1934 French Championships.

Seeds
The seeded players are listed below. Gottfried von Cramm is the champion; others show the round in which they were eliminated.

  Fred Perry (quarterfinals)
  Jack Crawford (finalist)
  Bunny Austin (quarterfinals)
  Gottfried von Cramm (champion)
  Roderich Menzel (quarterfinals)
  Christian Boussus (semifinals)
  Daniel Prenn (third round)
  Giorgio de Stefani (semifinals)
  Adrian Quist (third round)
  Patrick Hughes (quarterfinals)
  Valentino Taroni (third round)
  Franjo Punčec (first round)
  Wilmer Hines (third round)
  Hermann Artens (fourth round)
  Mohammed Sleem (fourth round)
  Antoine Gentien (third round)

Draw

Key
 Q = Qualifier
 WC = Wild card
 LL = Lucky loser
 r = Retired

Finals

Earlier rounds

Section 1

Section 2

Section 3

Section 4

Section 5

Section 6

Section 7

Section 8

References

External links
   on the French Open website

1934 in French tennis
1934